Rodrigo Jokisch (born 1946) is a German sociologist.

Some books
 Determinants of the Technological Evolution in Europe. Structural Models for a better Understanding of the Process of Industrialization between the 17th and the 19th Century, Technological University of Berlin, 1980 (German)
 El Salvador, Guatemala and Honduras. Military Struggles and Political Reforms, Rowohlt, 1981 (German)
 To be a Man. Crisis and Identity of the Male in Modern Society, Rowohlt, 1982 (German)
 Sociology of Technology, Suhrkamp, 1984 (German)
 Man and Woman. Coming together, Rowohlt, 1984 f(German)
 Logic of Distinctions. A Protologic for a Theory of Society, Westdeutscher Verlag, 1996 (German)
 Methodology of Distinctions. Form–Complexity–Self-reference–Observation, Juan Pablos/UNAM, 2002, Mexico-City (Spanish)
 Observing and Discussing Society–A Theory of Society, 2006 (German, forthcoming)

Some articles
 'The Origin of Modern Biology in the Organological Discourse', in: Roman de Vicente (edit.), Replies from Biological Research, UNESCO und C.S.I.C.: Madrid, 1979, 101-117.
 'Technologischer Wandel in Gesamtdarstellungen. Probleme seiner Strukturierung für die Frühindustrialisierung' (zusammen mit H. Lindner), in: Kölner Zeitschrift für Soziologie und Sozialpsychologie, 1979, Heft 4, 672-688.
 'Probleme der spanischen Wissenschaftsentwicklung. Die Institutionalisierung der spanischen Histologie im 19. Jahrhundert als Beispiel', in: Actes de la société internationale d'histoire de la medicine, Barcelona 1981, 522-529.
 'Kraft und Identität. Überlegungen zur anthropologischen Voraussetzung der neuzeitlichen Wissenschaft', in: Zeitschrift für allgemeine Wissenschaftstheorie 1981, Bd. XII, 250-262.
 'Die nichtintentionalen Effekte menschlicher Handlungen. Ein klassisches soziologisches Problem', in: Kölner Zeitschrift für Soziologie und Sozialpsychologie, 1981, Heft 3, 547-575.
 'Macht - Frauen - Individualität', in: Barbara Schaeffer-Hegel (Hrsg.), Frauen und Macht, publica: Berlin, 1984, 167-182.
 'Die Hoffnungslosigkeit der Besitzlosen', in: Aufbrüche. Die Chronik der Republik, Freimut Duve (ed.), 1986, 433-438.
 'Aphorismen zum Thema Fotografie', in: brennpunkt, Magazin für Fotografie, Heft 3, Berlin, 1989, 10-20.
 'Die Form der Medien. Distinktionstheoretische Beobachtungen', in: Medien Journal 1/1997, Österreich, S. 44-59
 'Technik und Kunst. Distinktionstheoretische Beobachtungen', in: Stefan Weber (Hg.), Was konstruiert Kunst?, Passagen Verlag, Wien, 1999, 83-118
 'Das Konzept des Menschen als Bedingung der Möglichkeit einer Theorie der Gesellschaft–Eine (verspätete) Antwort an Niklas Luhmann'. Spanische Version bereits erschienen: ‘El concepto del hombre como concepto indispensable de las distinciones.’, en: Estudios Políticos, no. 21, 1999, 51-112
 'Zur Beobachtung von Handlung', in: Rainer Mackensen (Hrsg.), Handlung und Umwelt. Beiträge zu einer soziologischen Lokaltheorie, Leske & Budrich, 2000, S. 139-164
 'Wie ist Alltag möglich? Beobachtungen aus einer distinktionstheoretisch reformulierten Theorie der Handlung'. Spanische Version bereits erschienen: ‘Como es posible la ‚vida cotidiana‘ desde el punto de vista de la teoría de la acción social? Apuntes sobre Alfred Schütz y la Sociología de la vida cotidiana’, en: Estudios Sociológicos, Vol. XVIII, núm. 54, septiembre-diciembre, 2000, p. 547-554
 'Die Theorie des kommunikativen Handelns von Jürgen Habermas aus der Perspektive der Distinktionstheorie'. Teile enthalten in: ‘Apuntes sobre la teoría de la acción comunicativa de Jürgen Habermas, desde el punto de vista de la teoría de las distinciones, en: Estudios Políticos, núm. 24, Mayo-Agosto, 2000, p. 81-128
 'Über den politischen, den erzieherischen und den akademischen Diskurs. Ähnlichkeiten und Differenzen'. Spanische Version bereits erschienen in: ‘Reflexiones sobre el problema de la autonomía de los discursos universitarios, en : acta sociológica, nr. 31, 2001, p. 185-198
 'Die Frankfurter Schule und die Kritische Theorie–zwei verschiedene Konzepte'. Spanische Version bereits erschienen in: `La escuela de Frankfurt y la ‘teoría crítica’. Apuntes metodológicos`, en acta sociológica, no. 33, pp. 11–24, 2001
 'Problems with Theory-Construction of Grand Theories: Niklas Luhmann's Theory of Social Systems - an Example', in: SysteMéxico, TEC de Monterrey, México D.F., Special Edition: The Autopoietic Turn: Luhmann's Re-conceptualisation of the Social, p. 16-22, 2001
 'Über die Funktion des wissenschaftlichen Wissens in der Gesellschaft'. Spanische Version bereits erschienen in: ‘La función del conocimiento científico y social’, en: Diversidad Cultural, Política y Economía en un mundo global, edit. UNAM-FCPS, 2001 pp. 155–158
 'Zygmunt Bauman und das Konzept der Ambivalenz aus der Perspektive einer Methodologie der Distinktionen'. Spanische Version bereits erschienen in: Zygmunt Bauman: la ambivalencia y la metodología de las distinciones, en: acta sociológica, no. 35, pp. 15–30, 2002
 'Handlungstheorie, Pragmatismus und instrumentalistische Theorie der Wahrheit'. Spanische Version bereits erschienen in: Observando la acción social. Apuntes desde el punto de vista de la metodología de las distinciones y desde una teoría operativa-culturalista de la sociedad en: Castañeda, Fernando “Instantáneas de la Acción” pp. 73 a 148, Ed. UNAM-FCPyS-JuanPablos, México, 2002
 'Methodologie der Distinktionen und vorbereitende Bemerkungen zu einer Methodologie rationaler Diskurse–Fragen und Antworten'. Spanische Version bereits erschienen in: Metodología de las distinciones y apuntes preparatorios para una metodología de los discursos racionales Preguntas y respuestas, en: acta sociológica nr. 46, mayo-octubre 2006 UNAM, pp. 89–115 ISSN 0186-6028
 'Die Gesellschaft, das Recht, die Soziologie und die Theorie der Distinktionen'. Spanische Version bereits erschienen in: La sociedad, la sociologia, el derecho y la teoria de las distinciones, en: Arturo Chavez/Angelica Cuellar (edit.). Sociología del Derecho, FCPyS, UNAM, 2006
 'Formen der Kommunikation und Öffentliche Meinung'. Spanische Version bereits erschienen in: Formas de Comunicación y Opinión Publica, en Mexicana de Opinión Pública, UNAM, Vol. 1 No. 2., octubre 2006

References

1946 births
Living people
German sociologists
German male writers